Va Kio Daily is an independent Chinese-language daily newspaper published in Macau, China.

History
The newspaper was established in 1937 in Portuguese Macau.

See also
Media of Macau

External links
Official site

Chinese-language newspapers (Traditional Chinese)
Newspapers published in Macau
1937 establishments in Macau